Coulombiers is a commune in the Vienne department, region of Nouvelle-Aquitaine, France.

See also
Communes of the Vienne department

References

Communes of Vienne